Jake Maxwell Wright (born 11 March 1986) is an English footballer who last played as a defender for Boston United.

Wright started his career with Bradford City, but played only one senior game for them, before he joined Halifax Town where he had previously spent a loan spell. He spent two years at Halifax, but after they were demoted from the Conference Premier, he moved to Crawley Town in June 2008 before transferring to Brighton & Hove Albion in July 2009. After that he spent seven years at Oxford United where he made 278 total appearances, captained the club and won two promotions.

Career
Born in Keighley, West Yorkshire, Jake Wright started his football career as a youngster with Bradford City and, in April 2005, was one of four defenders to be given a one-year contract. In August 2005, he and fellow Bradford City player Danny Forrest moved to Conference National club Halifax Town on loan—Wright's an initial one-month loan deal. He made his debut on 10 September 2005, in a 4–0 Conference victory over Tamworth at The Shay. He twice extended his loan deal, staying with Halifax for three months, during which time he played 11 league games and three cup games, before he returned to Bradford. Wright made his Bradford debut as a second-half substitute against Colchester United on 4 February 2006, replacing Richard Edghill, who had broken his ankle. It would be his only senior appearance for Bradford.

During June 2006, Wright rejoined Halifax, this time on a permanent basis, along with Forrest and Hereford United goalkeeper Craig Mawson. Wright scored his first senior goal to help Halifax to their first home victory of the 2006–07 season, in a 3–1 win over Dagenham & Redbridge on 19 September 2006. Wright finished the season with two goals from 27 league games, before playing a further 36 games the following season. During the campaign, he picked up his first red card of his career, in a 1–0 defeat to Aldershot Town. Halifax Town avoided relegation despite a final-day defeat, because Altrincham also lost, but they faced liquidation and were eventually demoted, giving Altrincham a reprieve. Halifax were demoted and applied to join the Northern Premier League Division One North, but instead Wright moved back to the Conference Premier, by signing for Crawley Town in June 2008. He had played 63 league games for Halifax during his two years. After an impressive season making 41 League appearances, Wright attracted the interest of Football League clubs including Charlton Athletic and Colchester United.

On 27 July 2009, Wright was invited for a trial at League One side Brighton & Hove Albion and featured during the 1–0 pre-season friendly defeat to Torquay United. Brighton beat off competition from an unnamed Scottish Premier League club to sign Wright and completed the transfer with Wright signing a two-year contract with the Seagulls.

On 31 December 2009, Oxford United signed Wright on loan for the remainder of the season. Wright made 26 appearances during his loan spell at the Kassam Stadium. On 30 June 2010, Wright signed a three-year contract with Oxford on a free transfer after a successful loan spell that saw the club gain promotion back to the Football League. He was appointed club captain in July 2011 and extended his contract by a year in October 2011. After six seasons, and having made 278 appearances and captained the squad to second place in League Two and promotion in the 2015–16 season, Wright – the club's longest-serving player – left Oxford by mutual consent on 9 July 2016. Later that day, he signed for League One club Sheffield United on a two-year contract.
Wright's first appearance for the Blades was on 27 August 2016 against his former club Oxford United. This was the club's first win of what became a promotion-winning season. Wright made 30 appearances in his first season as a Blade and remained unbeaten throughout the whole campaign, entering the record books in the process.

In the 2017–18 season Wright made 17 appearances for Sheffield United in the EFL Championship. This was the highest level Wright played at in his career (although he remained a Sheffield United player until part way through the club's 2019–20 season in the Premier League, he made no appearances).

On 2 September 2019, Wright joined EFL League One side Bolton Wanderers on loan until January and was one of nine players Bolton signed on deadline day. He made his debut on 14 September, starting against Rotherham United in a 6–1 defeat.

His contract with Sheffield United was terminated by mutual consent on 31 January 2020. He signed for Hereford on 18 September 2020. On 14 November 2020, Wright was released by Hereford.

On 26 February 2021, Wright joined League Two side Mansfield Town on a contract until the end of May 2021.

On 22 July 2021, Wright signed for Conference North side Boston United. Wright was released at the end of the 2021–22 season.

Style of play
He can play at left back or centre back.

Career statistics

Honours

Club
Oxford United
Conference Premier play-offs: 2010
Football League Two runner-up: 2015–16

Sheffield United
EFL League One: 2016–17

References

External links

Jake Wright profile at the Sheffield United F.C. website

1986 births
Living people
Sportspeople from Keighley
Footballers from West Yorkshire
English footballers
Association football defenders
Bradford City A.F.C. players
Halifax Town A.F.C. players
Crawley Town F.C. players
Brighton & Hove Albion F.C. players
Oxford United F.C. players
Sheffield United F.C. players
Bolton Wanderers F.C. players
Hereford F.C. players
Mansfield Town F.C. players
Boston United F.C. players
English Football League players
National League (English football) players